The 2018–19 Hartford Hawks women's basketball team represented the University of Hartford during the 2018–19 NCAA Division I women's basketball season. The Hawks, led by third year head coach Kim McNeill and will once again play their home games in the Chase Arena at Reich Family Pavilion and were members of the America East Conference. They finished the season 23–11, 14–2 in American East play to finish in second place. They advanced to the championship game of the America East women's tournament where they lost to Maine. They received an automatic bid to the Women's National Invitation Tournament, where they lost to Providence in the first round.

Media
All home games and conference road games will stream on either ESPN3 or AmericaEast.tv. Most road games will stream on the opponents website. All games will be broadcast on the radio on WWUH.

Roster

Schedule

|-
!colspan=9 style=| Non-conference regular season

|-
!colspan=9 style=| America East regular season

|-
!colspan=9 style=| America East Women's Tournament

|-
!colspan=9 style=| WNIT

See also
 2018–19 Hartford Hawks men's basketball team

References

Hartford Hawks women's basketball seasons
Hartford
Hartford Hawks women's b
Hartford Hawks women's b
Hartford